Airborne Artillery Units provide Artillery support to Airborne forces.

A
Australia
'A' Field Battery, Royal Australian Artillery
Argentina
4th Paratrooper Artillery Group

B
Brazil
 8th Group Artillery Pára-que
 21st Battery Anti-Aérea Pára-que

C
China
Light Artillery Regiment, 43rd Parachute Division
Light Artillery Regiment, 44th Parachute Division
Light Artillery Regiment, 45th Parachute Division

F
France
35e Régiment d'Artillerie Parachutiste

G
Germany
Light Air Defence Battery (Airborne) 100
Greece
116th Airmobile Artillery Squadron
71st Light Air Defence Battery

I
India
9 Para Field Regiment
17 (Parachute) Field Regiment (Zojila & Poongali Bridge)
Indonesia
 Batalyon Artileri Medan 9 (Para)
 Batalyon Artileri Medan 10 (Para)
 Batalyon Artileri Medan 13 (Para)
Italy
 185th Paratroopers Artillery Regiment "Folgore"

J
Japan
Narashino Airborne Brigade Field Artillery Battalion

M
Malaysia
Rejimen Pertama Artileri Diraja (PARA)
361 Bti Rejimen Artileri Diraja (PARA)

N
Netherlands
11 Air Defense Company (Air Assault) Samarinda

R
Russia
1137th Guards Artillery Regiment
1140th Guards Artillery Regiment
1065th Guards Artillery Regiment
1182nd Guards Artillery Regiment
1120th Training Artillery Regiment

S
South Africa
18 Light Regiment of 44 Parachute Brigade, South African Defence Force
Spain
6th Parachute Artillery Battalion Paracaidista

U
Ukraine
25th Separate Dnipropetrovsk Airborne Brigade Artillery Group and Anti-Aircraft Artillery Battalion
95th Airmobile Brigade Artillery Battalion
United Kingdom
7th Parachute Regiment Royal Horse Artillery
United States of America
319th Airborne Field Artillery Regiment (1st, 2nd, 3rd) and 4th Battalions.
2nd Battalion, 321st Airborne Field Artillery Regiment
2nd Battalion (Airborne), 377th Field Artillery Regiment (Brigade Combat Team (Airborne), 25th Infantry Division)
18th Fires Brigade

 01
.Artillery Units
Airborne Artillery Units
Military parachuting
Artillery Units